Christopher Drake is an American film, television and video game composer.

Drake was selected by director Guillermo del Toro to provide the music for the first two 75-minute animated films, Hellboy: Sword of Storms and Hellboy: Blood and Iron released by Starz Media in 2006 and 2007. Drake also collaborated with del Toro in rescoring one of his early films Geometría, included in The Criterion Collection edition of del Toro's Cronos.

In 2008, Drake joined composers Robert J. Kral and Kevin Manthei in writing music for Warner Bros.'s Batman: Gotham Knight (2008). Following Gotham Knight, Drake scored the fourth in the line of DC Universe Animated Original Movies, Wonder Woman (2009).

Drake wrote the scores for the animated films Superman/Batman: Public Enemies (2009), Justice League: Crisis on Two Earths (2010), Batman: Under the Red Hood (2010), All-Star Superman (2011), Green Lantern: Emerald Knights (2011), Batman: Year One (2011), Justice League: Doom (2012), and Batman: The Dark Knight Returns (2012–13).

Drake is also known for his work in video games, such as Hellboy: The Science of Evil (2008) Injustice: Gods Among Us (2013), Batman: Arkham Origins (2013), and Injustice 2 (2017).

In 2017, Drake was hired as the composer for Netflix's remake of the  Lost in Space series, but later replaced by Christopher Lennertz.

Discography

Film

Video games

External links

Official Christopher Drake Composer Website.

American film score composers
American male film score composers
American television composers
Living people
Video game composers
Year of birth missing (living people)
Place of birth missing (living people)